Torre del Gran San Pietro is  a mountain in the Gran Paradiso massif, a sub-group of the Graian Alps, with an elevation of 3,692 m. It is located between Piedmont and Aosta Valley, in northern Italy,  near the Cogne Valley.

First ascent
In 1865 Amé Gorret, Martino Baretti, and J. P. Carrel reached a subsidiary summit on the crest of the mountain, which they subsequently dubbed Pic du Retour.  Two years later, Daniel Ballay and Michel Payot guided Douglas Freshfield, C. C. Tucker, T. H. Carson, and J. H. Backhouse to the main summit.

See also
 List of mountains of the Alps

References

Mountains of Aosta Valley
Mountains of Piedmont
Mountains of the Graian Alps
Alpine three-thousanders